Vol Walker Hall (earlier Vol Walker Library) is a building on the University of Arkansas campus in Fayetteville, Arkansas. It contains the Fay Jones School of Architecture and Design. The structure was added to the National Register of Historic Places in 1992.

Eponym
The University of Arkansas Board of Trustees changed the name to honor James Volney "Vol" Walker in the spring of 1934. An 1877 University of Arkansas alumnus, respected lawyer, and member of the Arkansas legislature, Walker was instrumental in keeping the University in Fayetteville despite efforts to move it.

History
Vol Walker Hall was born when University President John C. Futrall decided to utilized Public Works Administration funds available to the University of Arkansas to build a new library. Planning for the new library (and also a new science building) began in March 1931. A similar library at the University of Rochester was used as a blueprint, and eventually Futrall brought in the original designers of the Rochester library, Gordon and Kaehler.

The hall contained the University library from 1935 until 1968, when it was supplanted by Mullins Library. It was at this time that the name was changed to Vol Walker Hall.

Expansion

A two-year renovation and expansion of Vol Walker Hall was completed in 2013, culminating in the new Steven L. Anderson Design Center being attached to the historic structure. The design center added  of studio, faculty, and classroom space and allows the Fay Jones School of Architecture and Design to be entirely housed under one roof for the first time. Designed by the School of Architecture's Distinguished Professor Marlon Blackwell, the expansion has received several awards in the architecture community, including a 2018 American Institute of Architects Honor Award for Architecture, a 2014 American Institute of Architects (AIA) Gulf States Honor Award and Architects Newspaper's Building of the Year.

See also
National Register of Historic Places listings in Washington County, Arkansas

References

External links
 University of Arkansas

University of Arkansas buildings
University and college buildings on the National Register of Historic Places in Arkansas
School buildings completed in 1935
Public Works Administration in Arkansas
National Register of Historic Places in Fayetteville, Arkansas
University and college buildings completed in 1935
1935 establishments in Arkansas